Xysticus concursus is a species of crab spider in the family Thomisidae. It is found in the United States.

References

Thomisidae
Articles created by Qbugbot
Spiders described in 1934